The FA Trophy 2009–10 is the 40th season of the FA Trophy, the Football Association's cup competition for teams at levels 5–8 of the English football league system. The number of team entries for this season was initially 265, but this was reduced to 264 when Newcastle Blue Star withdrew.

Calendar

Preliminary round
Ties will be played on 3 October 2009.

Ties

Replays

First round qualifying
Ties will be played on 17 October 2009.

Teams from Premier Division of Southern League, Northern Premier League and Isthmian League entered in this round.

Ties

Replays

Ties

Second round qualifying
Ties will be played on 31 October 2009.

Ties

Replays

Ties

Third round qualifying
Ties will be played on 21 November 2009

Teams from Conference North and Conference South entered in this round.

Ties

Replays

First round
This round is the first in which Conference Premier teams join those from lower reaches of the National League System. Matches took place on 12 December. Since King's Lynn folded, Vauxhall Motors received a walkover to the second round.

The fixture between Maidstone United and Histon was postponed in December due to a waterlogged pitch and rearranged for 15 December. This match, however, did not go ahead because of a frozen pitch and neither did the third attempt at playing this fixture on 22 December. The match was then scheduled to take place on 5 January, but this was also postponed due to bad weather. The match was then scheduled to take place on 12 January, but was subsequently postponed once more. The game was eventually played on 19 January, resulting in a 3-0 win for Histon. However, on 25 January, Maidstone were re-instated in the competition after Histon were found to have fielded an ineligible player.

Ties

Replays

Second round
Matches were to take place on Saturday, 9 January 2010, but the bad weather that engulfed the country meant that all were postponed and rescheduled provisionally for between 11 and 13 January. Most of the games were further postponed to between 18 and 20 January.

Ties

Replays

Third round
Matches took place on 30 January 2010.

Ties

Ties

Fourth round
Matches took place on 20 February 2010. The match between Barrow and York City was postponed twice because of a frozen pitch.

Semi-finals

First leg

Second leg

Final

References

General
 Football Club History Database: FA Trophy 2009-10

League
2009–10 domestic association football cups
2009-10